Marián Pišoja (born 16 June 2000) is a Slovak footballer who plays for Dukla Banská Bystrica as a centre-back.

Club career
Pišoja made his Fortuna Liga debut for AS Trenčín against FC ViOn Zlaté Moravce on 23 February 2019.

References

External links
 MFK Dukla Banská Bystrica official club profile 
 Futbalnet profile 
 
 

2000 births
Living people
Sportspeople from Považská Bystrica
Slovak footballers
Slovakia youth international footballers
Association football defenders
AS Trenčín players
MŠK Púchov players
MFK Dukla Banská Bystrica players
Slovak Super Liga players
2. Liga (Slovakia) players